Darya Igorevna Klishina (born 15 January 1991) is a Russian long jumper.

Early life
Klishina was born in 1991 in Tver, Russian SFSR. At the age of eight, she began playing volleyball, and at thirteen changed her preference for athletics in long jump.

Career

Klishina achieved a jump of 7.03 metres on 26 June 2010, a Russian junior record, and the second best junior mark of all time. This jump was also the second best jump in the world that year, behind only her teammate Olga Kucherenko's mark of 7.13 metres. Despite her dominance in the long jump in 2010, Klishina did not compete at the 2010 World Junior Championships in Athletics. In 2013, she moved from Russia to the United States.

In 2016, Klishina was approved to compete at the 2016 Summer Olympics through special permission granted by the IAAF. The IAAF had suspended the Russian national federation from competing due to breach of anti-doping rules, and Klishina was the only member of the athletics team allowed to compete. This decision was initially reversed on 13 August 2016. Klishina immediately appealed the decision, saying that she was "a clean athlete and have proved that already many times and beyond any doubt. Based in the US for three years now, I have been almost exclusively tested outside of the Anti-Doping system in question. I am falling victim to those who created a system of manipulating our beautiful sport and is guilty of using it for political purposes." On 15 August 2016, the eve of the long jump event, Klishina's appeal was upheld, allowing her to compete. She qualified for the long jump final, finishing ninth. For the first time in 20 years, Russian women failed to win an Olympic medal in the long jump.

Klishina competed as an authorised neutral athlete at the 2017 World Championships in Athletics in London. She won the silver medal with a season-best jump of 7.00 metres.

International competitions

Personal bests

See also
List of World Athletics Championships medalists (women)
List of European Athletics Championships medalists (women)
List of European Athletics Indoor Championships medalists (women)
List of sports rivalries

References

External links

 
 
 
 Darya Klishina long jump events - videos and pictures

1991 births
Living people
Sportspeople from Tver
Russian female long jumpers
Olympic female long jumpers
Olympic athletes of Russia
Athletes (track and field) at the 2016 Summer Olympics
Athletes (track and field) at the 2020 Summer Olympics
World Athletics Championships medalists
World Athletics Championships athletes for Russia
Authorised Neutral Athletes at the World Athletics Championships
European Athletics Championships medalists
European Athletics Indoor Championships winners
Universiade gold medalists in athletics (track and field)
Universiade gold medalists for Russia
Medalists at the 2013 Summer Universiade
World Youth Championships in Athletics winners
Russian Athletics Championships winners
21st-century Russian women